The Kerala State Television Award for Best Actor is an honour presented annually at the Kerala State Television Awards of India to an actor for the best performance in a leading role in a Malayalam telefilm or serial. Until 1997, the awards were managed directly by the Department of Cultural Affairs, Government of Kerala. Since 1998, the Kerala State Chalachitra Academy, an autonomous non-profit organisation functioning under the Department of Cultural Affairs, has been exercising control over the awards.

Superlatives

Winners
The 2008 recipient Murali  for Aranazhikaneram  and 2013 recipient Salim Kumar  for Parethante Paribhavangal are the only 2 actors to win the National Film Award for Best Actor, Kerala State Film Award for Best Actor and Kerala State Television Award under the category of Best Actor

See also

 List of Asian television awards

References

External links
 

Television awards for Best Actor
Kerala awards
Indian television awards